"Strangers on the Shore...!" is An episode of the BBC sitcom Only Fools and Horses, first screened on 25 December 2002 as the second part of the early 2000s Christmas trilogy, the seventeenth Christmas special and the 63rd episode of the series.

Synopsis
As the Trotters lost their fortune due to the collapse of the Central American market, Del Boy has been a chauffeur for Boycie. As Boycie and Marlene prepare to go to a relative's wedding, Boycie boasts to Del about how he is going be a millionaire when he travels to France in a month's time to sign a multi-million pound deal with an Iranian businessman, and will not make the same mistakes that Del made. Annoyed by Boycie's insults, Del gains his revenge on Boycie by squeezing a tube of onion purée into his hair gel (Boycie cannot smell it because he has a blocked nose). Meanwhile, at Nelson Mandela House, Del buys twenty Slovakian log-effect gas fires and a letter arrives addressed to the late Uncle Albert informing him of a naval reunion at a village in France.

Sometime later, at The Nag's Head, Raquel and a pregnant Cassandra join Del and Rodney in a conversation about how Albert's life journey and love life are similar to the film Captain Corelli's Mandolin, before Raquel shows Del Albert's letter. Since Albert has died, Rodney suggests that they represent Albert at the reunion and scatter his ashes at sea. Del agrees, but also has other plans, such as asking Denzil and Trigger to travel with them in Denzil's lorry, to allow them to purchase a large amount of duty-free alcohol which they can sell to Sid at the pub.

On the ferry to France, Del and Rodney scatter Albert's ashes into the sea. They arrive in France and drive to the village of St. Claire de la Chappelle where they meet another former sailor named George Parker. In a café, as George tells them about how much of a lothario Albert was, the Trotter brothers notice that a number of the men in the village bear a striking resemblance to Albert. Meanwhile, Denzil and Trigger wait for Del at the wine warehouse.

After the reunion, the Trotters drive back to the ferry port and meet Denzil and Trigger at the wine warehouse, where they load Denzil's lorry with duty-free Saint-Omer beer to take back to England with them.

Later that night, back at Nelson Mandela House and while storing the beer in Del's garage, Denzil and Trigger find an man in the back of Denzil's lorry, who they assume is an illegal immigrant. The Trotter brothers head down to the garage and investigate. They are unable to find out the man's name as he does not speak English. Del and Rodney bring him up to the flat and introduce him to Raquel, Damien, and Cassandra as "Gary", a friend whom Rodney met at evening school. A short time later, Boycie shows up asking to stay the night at the flat, because a gas leak from the log-effect fires Del sold him has filled his house with gas and the fire brigade has evacuated the entire road. Marlene and Tyler are staying at her mother's, who has barred Boycie from staying because of an altercation at the wedding (caused by the onion purée Del squeezed into Boycie's hair gel). Feeling guilty, Del reluctantly allows Boycie to stay.

A few days later, the fire brigade allow Boycie to move back into his house, and he asks Del to drive him to France the following week so he can sign the contract. Rodney suggests taking "Gary" back with them, but Del refuses out of fear of being caught smuggling a migrant out of the country. Boycie tells them that Damien has taken him to play football with his friends and he has not been seen since. The Trotters drive Boycie to France in a van (which Del intends to fill up with more cheap alcohol), while a news report featuring "Gary" reveals his real name to be Rashid Mamoon (he was working at the wine warehouse and loading Denzil's lorry, when Del accidentally trapped him under some beer boxes), and that the police are searching for the "Gary Gang". When Del, Rodney, and Boycie arrive in France, they meet with Boycie's business partner, Mr. Mamoon, who introduces them to his son, Rashid. Believing the trio are there to demand a ransom, Rashid panics and claims Boycie and the Trotter brothers are the kidnappers. Mr. Mamoon calls the police and Del, Rodney and Boycie are arrested for kidnapping.

Episode cast

Music
 Blue: "All Rise"
 Toploader: "Dancing in the Moonlight"
 Travis: "Flowers in the Window"

References

External links
 
 

2002 British television episodes
Only Fools and Horses special episodes
British Christmas television episodes